Standing Up may refer to:

The act of standing or orthostasis
Standing Up (film), a 2013 coming-of-age film  based on the novel The Goats, written by Brock Cole